Tano Station (田野駅) is the name of two train stations in Japan:

 Tano Station (Kōchi)
 Tano Station (Miyazaki)

See also
 Tanno Station